Vorombe is one of three genera of elephant birds, an extinct family of large ratite birds endemic to Madagascar. Originally considered to be large Aepyornis specimens, it is now thought Vorombe are the largest and heaviest birds known to have existed. The genus was erected in 2018 after a detailed morphometric analysis.

Taxonomy and naming
 
Vorombe titan was first described by Charles William Andrews as Aepyornis titan in 1894, though it was later synonymized with the type species of Aepyornis, A. maximus, by American paleontologist Pierce Brodkorb in 1963. In 2018, James Hansford and Samuel Turvey, two researchers from the Zoological Society of London, found that it was sufficiently distinct from Aepyornis based on genetic and morphological evidence and allocated the species to a new genus, Vorombe. They also recognized Aepyornis ingens as a synonym of Vorombe titan. The study by Hansford and Turvey is the first taxonomic reassessment of elephant birds in over 50 years.

The genus name Vorombe is derived from the Malagasy word vorombe meaning "big bird" while the specific name titan is derived from the Ancient Greek word Τιτάν (Titan), which refers to the Greek gods that preceded the Twelve Olympians.

Specimens and features

The syntype series of Vorombe titan includes a femur (NHMUK A439) and tibiotarsus (NHMUK A437) found in Itampolo (Itampulu Vé), Madagascar, with the femur originally being the lectotype of Aepyornis ingens.

The femur of Vorombe is significantly larger than that of Aepyornis and Mullerornis in all measurements. Notable features include enlarged proximal and distal ends, a more acute curvature in the medio-distal margin of the femoral head (caput femoris), the presence of a marked lateral supracondylar ridge, and a medial condyle (condylus medialis) that is expanded medially and flatter than in Aepyornis. The tibiotarsus is extremely large in comparison to Aepyornis and Mullerornis. The proximal and distal ends are enlarged, particularly medio-laterally. It has a more marked narrowing transition into the shaft, which is narrower in proportion to the total length compared to Aepyornis.

The tarsometatarsus is significantly larger and more expanded medio-laterally than in other genera, mainly at the proximal and distal ends. The lateral portion of the proximal articular surface protrudes proximally to the medial portion, creating a prominently angled proximal articular surface similar to that of A. hildebrandti. The tarsometatarsus is larger than Mullerornis in all measurements, and larger than Aepyornis in most measurements.

Samples from two femora assigned to Vorombe titan (specimens MNHN MAD 364 and NHMUK A2142) were sent for accelerator mass spectrometer carbon-14 dating at the Oxford Radiocarbon Accelerator Unit and calibrated using ShCal13. Both specimens were dated to the Holocene (3,680 to 2,352 BP).

Size
This is greater than the mass estimates of other extinct Quaternary giant birds such as Dinornis (which was between ) and Dromornis stirtoni (between ) making it the largest known bird. The largest femur (MNHN MAD 368) measured by Hansford and Turvey could not be formally assigned to a cluster (group) as it was incomplete. The specimen is thought to belong to Vorombe on the basis of its size.

Ecology
Vorombe titan, Aepyornis maximus and Mullerornis modestus were found across much of Madagascar, and were sympatric in the arid spiny forests in the south, succulent woodlands in the southwest, and grassland/subhumid forest mosaic in the Central Highlands. The significant size differences between the three taxa indicates that they exploited different dietary niches and plant interactions. Elephant birds shared the Quaternary ecosystems of Madagascar with dwarf hippos, giant lemurs and giant tortoises.

See also
 Island gigantism

References

Elephant birds
Extinct animals of Madagascar
Birds described in 2018
Extinct monotypic bird genera